Unity College is a private college based in New Gloucester, Maine with an additional campus in Unity and facilities in Moose River and Thorndike. It offers undergraduate and graduate education based on sustainability science that emphasizes study of the environment and natural resources. Initially founded as a residential school in Unity, Maine, Unity College expanded into online education in 2016 which grew both its enrollment and number of academic programs. The college moved its online program to the historic Pineland Farms campus in New Gloucester in 2019 and later relocated their administrative headquarters there. Unity College operates both an online-only program and a hybrid program with on-campus courses in New Gloucester and Unity. It also operates a farm and indoor growing facility in Thorndike and an outdoor center in Moose River. 

On February 27, 2023, Unity announced it would change its name to Unity Environmental University. The new name will be introduced gradually over the next year.

History
The college was founded in 1965 as the Unity Institute of Liberal Arts and Sciences with a faculty of 15 and a student body of 39. The founders, a group of local business people, were looking for ways to counter economic decline in the town of Unity. Two years later, it changed its name to Unity College and in 1969 awarded degrees to its first graduating class of 24. The college's founders had previously considered opening a bowling alley and a sock factory before settling on the college, which didn't adopt an environmental-oriented focus until 1977. It built the first Passivhaus college residence in the U.S. in 2011 and became the first college in the country to divest its endowment of fossil fuels in 2012. 

Unity underwent a tumultuous period in the 1980s, when it was placed on probation by its accreditor. President Wilson Hess, a professor who was selected to lead the college in the middle of the crisis, led fundraising efforts to put Unity on a firm financial footing. The college received an unprecedented $10 million gift in 2011 and its endowment has since grown to $18 million. Unity began offering online education in 2016 with its first master's degree, in Professional Science. It began offering undergraduate online programs two years later. In 2020, Unity College closed its Unity campus due to the COVID-19 pandemic in the United States. During the prolonged pandemic-related closure, the college announced it would pivot away from a traditional residential model and would consider selling its campus. In 2021, Unity College President Melik Peter Khoury told the Morning Sentinel that the campus was "never listed for sale" and that it would reopen for the fall term.

Unity College moved its online program offices from Unity to New Gloucester in 2019. In 2021, when the fate of the Unity, Maine campus was still uncertain, the college announced a new online and commuter junior college which would also be located in New Gloucester called the Technical Institute for Environmental Professions. The college also moved its headquarters to New Gloucester, though it continues to operate the Unity, Maine campus as its sole residential campus. Residential students complete their general education courses online under the college's hybrid model.

Past presidents include Mitchell Thomashow, Wilson Hess, and Stephen Mulkey.

Athletics
Unity College had an athletics program and was a member of the Division II level of the United States Collegiate Athletic Association (USCAA), primarily competing in the Yankee Small College Conference (YSCC) from 2008–09 until 2018–19. Known as the Rams, the athletics program featured both USCAA-sanctioned sports and club sports, including a Woodsman team.

Previously, Unity competed in up to nine intercollegiate varsity sports: Men's sports included basketball, cross country, soccer and track & field; while women's sports included basketball, cross country, soccer, track & field and volleyball. Additionally Unity College had a number of club sports: woodsmen's team, ice hockey, indoor soccer, lacrosse, martial arts and ultimate frisbee; plus intramural sports.

Accomplishments
The Unity College men's and women's cross-country teams both won the 1996 National Small College Athletic Association (NSCAA) National Championship meet held at Michigan Christian College in Rochester Hills, Michigan. These were Unity College's first-ever men's and women's national championship teams. The NSCAA was the predecessor of today's United States Collegiate Athletic Association (USCAA). In 1992 the Unity College women's cross country team won the NAIA Division 5 New England Championship meet held at Johnson State College, Vermont.

Student life 
Unity College's Unity campus is home to dozens of extra-curricular clubs and activities for students. Unity Commons was the student-run newspaper, consisting of locally focused journalism and student submissions of art, photography, poetry, and short fiction. It has not published since 2020.

References

External links
 Official website
 Official athletics website 

 
Educational institutions established in 1965
Universities and colleges in Waldo County, Maine
USCAA member institutions
1965 establishments in Maine
Private universities and colleges in Maine